And So They Were Married is a 1936 American romantic comedy film directed by Elliott Nugent that features Melvyn Douglas and Mary Astor. The film was released by Columbia Pictures.

Premise
When widower Stephen Blake (Douglas) and bitter divorcée Edith Farnham (Astor) meet at a ski resort during a Christmas vacation, Blake's son and Farnham's daughter conspire to keep their romance from the altar. After creating much mayhem, they succeed in breaking things up, only to reconsider for their parents' happiness.

Cast
 Melvyn Douglas as Stephen Blake
 Mary Astor as Edith Farnham
 Edith Fellows as Brenda Farnham
 Jackie Moran as Tommy Blake
 Donald Meek as the Hotel Manager
 Dorothy Stickney as Miss Peabody
 Romaine Callender as Mr. Snirley
 Douglas Scott as Horace

References

External links
 
 
 
 

1936 films
1930s Christmas comedy films
1936 romantic comedy films
American black-and-white films
American Christmas comedy films
American romantic comedy films
Columbia Pictures films
Films directed by Elliott Nugent
Films set around New Year
1930s English-language films
1930s American films